This is a list of NCAA Division I men's basketball tournament bids by school, and is updated through 2023. There are currently 68 bids possible each year (32 automatic qualifiers, 36 at-large). Schools not currently in Division I are in italics (e.g., CCNY) and some have appeared under prior names (e.g., UTEP went by Texas Western in 1966). Teams in bold will be participating in the 2023 NCAA Division I men's basketball tournament. Vacated appearances are excluded from the Bids table and noted below it.

Bids
As the tournament field started with only 8 teams in 1939 (all "Elite 8" by default), it was not until 1975 that all teams needed to win to advance to an alliteratively-named round (e.g., Elite 8, Sweet 16), hence some gaps may appear in the table for bids prior to 1951.
 1939–1950: 8 teams
 1951–1952: 16 teams
 1953–1974: varied from 22 to 25 teams
 1975–present: 32 or more teams

Active schools with no bids
The schools shown in the tables below have never made it to the NCAA tournament. Several schools are not yet eligible for the NCAA tournament since NCAA rules state programs transitioning from NCAA Division II must wait 4 years after joining Division I before they are eligible for championship tournaments. St. Thomas (MN), which is making an unprecedented transition from NCAA Division III to D-I, has received NCAA approval for a 5-year transition process.

Eligibility dates for current transitional schools are:
 2024: Merrimack
 2025: Bellarmine, UC San Diego, Tarleton, Utah Tech
 2027: Lindenwood, Queens (NC), Southern Indiana, St. Thomas (MN), Stonehill, and Texas A&M–Commerce.

Eligible
Below is a list of schools that have been eligible for at least one NCAA tournament but have never made it.

Ineligible
Below is a list of schools that are active but not yet eligible for the NCAA tournament.

Notes

References

See also
 NCAA Division I men's basketball tournament bids by school and conference
 NCAA Division I women's basketball tournament bids by school
 NIT bids by school
 CBI bids by school
 CIT bids by school
 List of NCAA Division II men's basketball tournament bids by school
 List of NCAA Division III men's basketball tournament bids by school

NCAA Division I lists
Bids By School
College men's basketball records and statistics in the United States
College basketball in the United States lists